Nottinghamshire (abbreviated Notts.) is a ceremonial and non-metropolitan county in the East Midlands, England. A landlocked county, it is bordered by  South Yorkshire to the north-west, Lincolnshire to the east, Leicestershire to the south, and Derbyshire to the west. The most-populated settlement is the City of Nottingham, which is administered as a unitary authority area. Nottinghamshire County Council, which administers the rest of the county, is based at West Bridgford in Rushcliffe. In 2017, the population was estimated to be 785,800.

Nottinghamshire is divided into the seven non-metropolitan boroughs of Ashfield, Bassetlaw, Broxtowe, Gedling, Mansfield, Newark and Sherwood, and Rushcliffe. Nottingham was administratively part of Nottinghamshire between 1974 and 1998, but is now a unitary authority which remains part of Nottinghamshire for ceremonial purposes. The county saw a minor change in its boundaries as Finningley was transferred to the City of Doncaster in South Yorkshire.

History

Nottinghamshire lies on the Roman Fosse Way, and there are Roman settlements in the county; for example at Mansfield, and forts such as at the Broxtowe Estate in Bilborough. The county was settled by Angles around the 5th century, and became part of the Kingdom, and later Earldom, of Mercia. However, there is evidence of Saxon settlement at the Broxtowe Estate, Oxton, near Nottingham, and Tuxford, east of Sherwood Forest. The name first occurs in 1016, but until 1568, the county was administratively united with Derbyshire, under a single Sheriff. In Norman times, the county developed malting and woollen industries. During the industrial revolution, the county held much needed minerals such as coal and iron ore, and had constructed some of the first experimental waggonways in the world; an example of this is the Wollaton wagonway of 1603–1616, which transported minerals from bell pitt mining areas at Strelley and Bilborough, this led to canals and railways being constructed in the county, and the lace and cotton industries grew. In the 18th and 19th centuries, mechanised deeper collieries opened, and mining became an important economic sector, though these declined after the 1984–85 miners' strike.

Until 1610, Nottinghamshire was divided into eight Wapentakes. Sometime between 1610 and 1719, they were reduced to six – Newark, Bassetlaw, Thurgarton, Rushcliffe, Broxtowe, and Bingham, some of these names still being used for the modern districts. Oswaldbeck was absorbed in Bassetlaw, of which it forms the North Clay division, and Lythe in Thurgarton.

Nottinghamshire is famous for its involvement with the legend of Robin Hood. This is also the reason for the numbers of tourists who visit places like Sherwood Forest, City of Nottingham, and the surrounding villages in Sherwood Forest. To reinforce the Robin Hood connection, the University of Nottingham in 2010 has begun the Nottingham Caves Survey, with the goal "to increase the tourist potential of these sites". The project "will use a 3D laser scanner to produce a three dimensional record of more than 450 sandstone caves around Nottingham".

Nottinghamshire was mapped first by Christopher Saxton in 1576; the first fully surveyed map of the county was by John Chapman, who produced Chapman's Map of Nottinghamshire in 1774.  The map was the earliest printed map at a sufficiently useful scale (one statute mile to one inch) to provide basic information on village layout, and the existence of landscape features such as roads, milestones, tollbars, parkland, and mills.

Physical geography

There is an oilfield near Eakring. These are overlaid by sandstones and limestones in the west, and clay in the east. The north of the county is part of the Humberhead Levels lacustrine plain. The centre and south west of the county, around Sherwood Forest, features undulating hills with ancient oak woodland. Principal rivers are the Trent, Idle, Erewash, and Soar. The Trent, fed by the Soar, Erewash, and Idle, composed of many streams from Sherwood Forest, run through wide and flat valleys, merging at Misterton. The lowest is Peat Carr, east of Blaxton, at sea level; the Trent is tidal below Cromwell Lock.

Nottinghamshire is sheltered by the Pennines to the west, so receives relatively low rainfall at  annually.  The average temperature of the county is 8.8–10.1 degrees Celsius (48–50 degrees Fahrenheit).  The county receives between 1321 and 1470 hours of sunshine per year.

Green belt

Nottinghamshire contains one green belt area, first drawn up from the 1950s. Completely encircling the Nottingham conurbation, it stretches for several miles into the surrounding districts, and extends into Derbyshire.

Politics

Nottinghamshire is represented by eleven (11) members of parliament (MPs). The three seats within the City of Nottingham are represented by Labour Party MPs, with the other eight Nottinghamshire seats represented by Conservative MPs.

Following the 2017 County Council elections, the County Council is controlled by a coalition of Conservatives and Mansfield Independent Forum, having taken control from the Labour administration. The seats held are 31 Conservatives, 23 Labour, 11 Independents, 1 Liberal Democrat. In the previous 2013 election, the County Council was Labour controlled, a gain from the Conservatives.

Local government is devolved to seven local borough and district councils. Ashfield is Ashfield Independents controlled; Bassetlaw, Gedling, and Mansfield are Labour controlled; while Broxtowe, Newark and Sherwood, and Rushcliffe are Conservative controlled.

Westminster Parliamentary

Political control
Nottinghamshire is a non-metropolitan county, governed by Nottinghamshire County Council and seven non-metropolitan district councils.  Elections to the county council take place every four years, with the first election taking place in 1973. Following each election, the county council has been controlled by the following parties:

Economy and industry
The regional economy was traditionally based on industries such as coal mining in the Leen Valley, and manufacturing. Since the invention of the knitting frame by local William Lee, the county, in particular Nottingham, became synonymous with the lace industry.

In 1998, Nottinghamshire had a gross domestic product (GDP) per-capita of £12,000, and a total GDP of £12,023 million. This is compared to a per-capita GDP of £11,848 for the East Midlands, £12,845 for England, and £12,548 for the United Kingdom. Nottingham had a GDP per-capita of £17,373, North Nottinghamshire £10,176, and South Nottinghamshire £8,448. In October 2005, the United Kingdom had 4.7% unemployment, the East Midlands 4.4%, and the Nottingham commuter belt area 2.4%.

Education

Secondary education
The county has comprehensive secondary education with 47 state secondary schools, as well as 10 private schools. The City of Nottingham local education authority (LEA) has 18 state schools and six independent schools, not including sixth form colleges.

A total of 9,700 pupils took GCSEs in the Nottinghamshire LEA in 2007. The best results were from the West Bridgford School, closely followed by Rushcliffe Spencer Academy and the Minster School in Southwell. The lowest performing school was the Queen Elizabeth's Endowed School in Mansfield. In Nottingham, the best results came from the Trinity Catholic School and the Fernwood School in Wollaton.

At A-level, the highest performing institution was The Becket School, followed by the West Bridgford School. Some of the county's best results tend to come from Nottingham High School, closely followed by the all-female Nottingham High School for Girls, both of which are privately run.

Higher education
The University of Nottingham is a Russell Group university and well-renowned, offering one of the broadest selections of courses in the UK. Nottingham Trent University is one of the most successful post-1992 universities in the UK. Nottingham is home to a campus of the University of Law. All three of these institutions  combine to make Nottingham one of England's largest student cities. Nottingham Trent University also has an agricultural college near Southwell, while the University of Nottingham has one at Sutton Bonington.

Culture
Nottinghamshire is home to the Sherwood Forest, known for its association with the legend of Robin Hood.

Nottinghamshire contains the ancestral home of the poet Lord Byron, Newstead Abbey, which he sold in 1818. It is now owned by Nottingham City Council, and is open to the public. The acclaimed author D. H. Lawrence was from Eastwood in Nottinghamshire. Toton was the birthplace and home of English folk singer-songwriter Anne Briggs, well known for her song Black Waterside. The north of the county is also noteworthy for its connections with the Pilgrim Fathers.  William Brewster, for example, came from the village of Scrooby, and was influenced by Richard Clyfton, who preached at Babworth.

Nottinghamshire County Cricket Club (NCCC) are a first class county cricket club who play at Trent Bridge in West Bridgford. They won the County Championship in 2010. The most successful football team within Nottinghamshire is Nottingham Forest, a Premier League club that won the 1978 English championship, and followed it up with winning the 1979 and 1980 European Cup titles. Mansfield Town, a League Two side, and Notts County, currently (2020–2021 season) in the National League, are other professional teams from the area.  Other notable sporting teams are the Nottingham Rugby Football Club, and the Nottingham Panthers Ice Hockey Club.

Nottinghamshire has international twinning arrangements with the province of Wielkopolska (Greater Poland) in western Poland, and with the province's capital city, Poznań.

In 2002, Crocus nudiflorus (Autumn crocus) was voted by the public as the county flower of Nottinghamshire.

BBC East Midlands is based in Nottingham and broadcasts news around the county; ITV Central also covers regional news in the county. BBC Radio Nottingham is the local public radio station. Northern parts of the county such as Worksop and Retford in the Bassetlaw area receive a better signal from the Emley Moor TV transmission so the area is covered by BBC Yorkshire and ITV Yorkshire.

Districts and boroughs

Areas

Settlements and features 
The traditional county town, and the largest settlement in the historic and ceremonial county boundaries, is the City of Nottingham.  The city is now administratively independent, but towns including Arnold, Carlton, West Bridgford, Beeston, and Stapleford are still within the administrative county, and West Bridgford is now home of the county council.

There are several market towns in the county.  Newark-on-Trent is a bridging point of the Fosse Way and River Trent, but is actually an Anglo-Saxon market town with a now ruined castle.  Mansfield, the second-largest settlement in the county after Nottingham, sits on the site of a Roman settlement, but grew after the Norman Conquest.  Worksop, in the north of the county, is also an Anglo-Saxon market town which grew rapidly in the industrial revolution, with the arrival of canals and railways and the discovery of coal.  Other market towns include Arnold, Bingham, Hucknall, Kirkby-in-Ashfield, Tuxford, Retford and Sutton-in-Ashfield.

The main railway in the county is the Midland Main Line, which links London to Sheffield via Nottingham.  The Robin Hood Line between Nottingham and Worksop serves several villages in the county.  The East Coast Main Line from London to Doncaster, Leeds, York, Newcastle upon Tyne, and Scotland serves the eastern Nottinghamshire towns of Newark and Retford.

The M1 motorway runs through the county, connecting Nottingham to London, Leeds, and Leicester by road.  The A1 road follows for the most part the path of the Great North Road, although in places it diverges from the historic route where towns have been bypassed.  Retford was by-passed in 1961, and Newark-on-Trent was by-passed in 1964, and the A1 now runs between Retford and Worksop past the village of Ranby.  Many historic coaching inns can still be seen along the traditional route.

East Midlands Airport is just outside the county in Leicestershire, while Doncaster Sheffield Airport lies within the historic boundaries of Nottinghamshire.  These airports serve the county and several of its neighbours.  Together, the airports have services to most major European destinations, and East Midlands Airport now also has services to North America and the Caribbean.  As well as local bus services throughout the county, Nottingham and its suburbs have a tram system, Nottingham Express Transit.

Nottingham and its surrounding areas form part of the Nottingham Urban Area while Bassetlaw is a non-constituent part of the Sheffield City Region.

Places of interest

Attenborough Nature Reserve
Clumber Park
Creswell Crags
The Harley Gallery
Hawton Church
Newstead Abbey
Nottingham Castle
Rufford Country Park
Rushcliffe Country Park
Sherwood Forest
Sherwood Observatory
Southwell Minster
The Workhouse Southwell
Welbeck Abbey
Wollaton Hall
Wollaton Park
Ye Olde Trip To Jerusalem

Silverhill, Nottinghamshire
 Felley Priory

See also
High Sheriff of Nottinghamshire
Lord Lieutenant of Nottinghamshire
Nottinghamshire Police and Crime Commissioner

References

External links

Nottinghamshire Heritage Gateway — essays on local history by experts; covers places, people, themes and events.
Visit Nottinghamshire 

 
Non-metropolitan counties
East Midlands
Counties of England established in antiquity